is a character created by Japanese video game designer Shigeru Miyamoto. He is the title character of the video game franchise of the same name and the mascot of Japanese video game company Nintendo. Mario has appeared in over 200 video games since his creation. Depicted as a short, pudgy, Italian plumber who resides in the Mushroom Kingdom, his adventures generally center on rescuing Princess Peach from the Koopa villain Bowser. Mario has access to a variety of power-ups that give him different abilities. Mario's brother is Luigi.

Mario first appeared as the player character of Donkey Kong (1981), a platform game. Miyamoto wanted to use Popeye as the protagonist, but when he could not achieve the licensing rights, he created Mario instead. Miyamoto expected the character to be unpopular and planned to use him for cameo appearances; originally called "Mr. Video", he was renamed to Mario after Mario Segale. Mario's clothing and characteristics were themed after the setting of Donkey Kong. He then began to star in the Super Mario series of platform games, beginning with the critically acclaimed Super Mario Bros. in 1985. Since 1992, Mario has been voiced by Charles Martinet.

After Super Mario Bros., Mario began to branch off to different genres. These include puzzle games such as Dr. Mario, role-playing games such as Paper Mario and Mario & Luigi, and sports games such as Mario Kart and Mario Tennis. He has appeared in other Nintendo properties, such as in the Super Smash Bros. series of crossover fighting games. Mario has also appeared in various animations, including three series produced by DIC Entertainment (voiced by Lou Albano and later Walker Boone), and was portrayed by Bob Hoskins in the 1993 Super Mario Bros. film. He will be voiced by Chris Pratt in the upcoming 2023 film adaptation.

Mario is near-unanimously considered to be the most famous character in the video game industry and an established pop culture icon. Mario's likeness has appeared in a variety of merchandise, such as clothing and collectible items, and people and places have been nicknamed after him. He has also inspired a considerable amount of unofficial media. With more than 750 million units sold worldwide, the overall Mario franchise is the bestselling video game franchise of all time.

Concept and creation

Shigeru Miyamoto created Mario while developing Donkey Kong in an attempt to produce a best-selling video game for Nintendo; previous games, such as Sheriff, had not achieved the success of games such as Namco's Pac-Man. Originally, Miyamoto wanted to create a game that used the characters Popeye, Bluto, and Olive Oyl. At the time, however, as Miyamoto was unable to acquire a license to use the characters (and would not until 1982 with Popeye), he would end up creating an unnamed player character, along with Donkey Kong, and Lady (later known as Pauline).

In the early stages of Donkey Kong, the focus of the game was to escape a maze, while Mario did not have the ability to jump. However, Miyamoto soon introduced jumping capabilities for the player character, reasoning that "[i]f you had a barrel rolling towards you, what would you do?"

Name
Though the protagonist was unnamed in the Japanese release of Donkey Kong, he was named "Jumpman" in the game's English instructions and "little Mario" in the sales brochure. Miyamoto envisioned a character to be used in every game developed by Miyamoto; a "go-to" character who could be placed into any game if needed, albeit in cameo appearances as Miyamoto did not, at the time, expect the character to become singularly popular. To this end, he originally named the character "Mr. Video", comparing what he intended for the character's appearances in later games to the cameos that Alfred Hitchcock had done within his films. In retrospect, Miyamoto commented that if he had named Mario "Mr. Video", Mario likely would have "disappeared off the face of the Earth."

According to a widely circulated story, during the localization of Donkey Kong for American audiences, Nintendo of America's warehouse landlord Mario Segale confronted then-president Minoru Arakawa, demanding back rent. Following a heated argument in which the Nintendo employees eventually convinced Segale he would be paid, they opted to name the character in the game Mario after him.

While it is implied by the title of the Mario Bros. series, in a 1989 interview his full name was stated not to be "Mario Mario". The first notable use of "Mario Mario" was in the 1993 live-action film adaptation of the Super Mario series, and was further used in Prima's official video game strategy guides, in 2000 for Mario Party 2 and in 2003 for Mario & Luigi: Superstar Saga. In 2012, after Charles Martinet voiced Mario declaring himself "Mario Mario" at the San Diego Comic-Con, the next month, Nintendo CEO Satoru Iwata said he had no last name, with which Miyamoto agreed the month after. Two months after Iwata's death in July 2015, Miyamoto changed his stance, asserting at the Super Mario Bros. 30th Anniversary festival that Mario's full name was indeed "Mario Mario".

Appearance and profession

By Miyamoto's own account, Mario's profession was chosen to fit with the game design: since Donkey Kong takes place on a construction site, Mario was made into a carpenter; and when he appeared again in Mario Bros., it was decided that he should be a plumber, because a lot of the game is situated in underground settings. Mario's character design, particularly his large nose, draws on western influences; once he became a plumber, Miyamoto decided to "put him in New York" and make him Italian, lightheartedly attributing Mario's nationality to his mustache. Other sources have Mario's profession chosen to be carpenter in an effort to depict the character as an ordinary hard worker, making it easier for players to identify with him. After a colleague suggested that Mario more closely resembled a plumber, Miyamoto changed Mario's profession accordingly and developed Mario Bros., featuring the character in the sewers of New York City.

Due to the graphical limitations of arcade hardware at the time, Miyamoto clothed the character in red overalls and a blue shirt to contrast against each other and the background, making the movements of his arms easily perceptible. A red cap was added to let Miyamoto avoid drawing the character's hairstyle, forehead, and eyebrows, as well as to circumvent the issue of animating his hair as he jumped. To give distinctly human facial features with the limited graphical abilities, Miyamoto drew a large nose and a mustache, which avoided the need to draw a mouth and facial expressions. Omitting a mouth circumvented the problem of clearly separating the nose from the mouth with a limited number of pixels available.

Over time, Mario's appearance has become more defined; blue eyes, white gloves, brown shoes, a red "M" in a white circle on the front of his hat and gold buttons on his overalls have been added. The colors of his shirt and overalls were also reversed from a blue shirt with red overalls to a red shirt with blue overalls. Miyamoto attributed this process to the different development teams and artists for each game as well as advances in technology.

Voice acting

Mario has been voiced by Charles Martinet since 1992. When he crashed the audition, the directors were preparing to close for the night, already packing up when he arrived. He was prompted with "an Italian plumber from Brooklyn"; when he heard the phrase, he immediately thought of a stereotypical Italian American with a voice similar to that of a mobster. He then assumed the voice would be too harsh for children, so he planned on using a voice of an older figure. However, according to Martinet, the audition for Mario was the only time where his thoughts crashed and he spoke complete nonsense. After he was prompted the character, he babbled the following in a soft and friendly voice instead:

The voice he chose was derived from another voice role he used to play the character Gremio from William Shakespeare's The Taming of the Shrew. Martinet kept speaking with the voice until the audition tape ran out; the clip was the only tape sent back to Nintendo, and when the director called the company he said he "found our Mario". For the following years he would use the voice for an attraction at trade shows: small tracking sensors were glued onto his face, and he would voice a 3D model of Mario's head on a television while he remained hidden behind a curtain. When attendees would approach the screen, they could talk and interact with Mario. The attraction was successful and would be used for five years until he was called by Miyamoto, requesting that he use the voice for a video game. 

His first official video game voice role would be Mario's Game Gallery in 1995, although in an interview he confirmed he used the voice for a Super Mario Bros. pinball game in 1992, but he was neither paid nor credited. His first major voice acting role was Super Mario 64. He received instructions on the types of sound clips needed from Miyamoto, and Martinet appreciated the fun tone of the game and called Miyamoto a genius. He has since also continued to voice other various Mario characters, such as Luigi, Wario, and Waluigi. His time in the studio recording voice clips consist of "45 takes of every sound [he] can think of", according to Martinet at a Q&A in Canada. What time he gives vocals for the game varies, and according to him has ranged from three years before a game's release to one week. The amound of clips varies as well, ranging from one hour of audio to 20 Martinet was recognized by the Guinness World Records for the most roles performed with the same character, at the time one hundred, and is the most of any video game voice actor. As of January 2022, he has voiced Mario in over 150 games and has recorded 5 million audio files with the voice. In an interview, Martinet said he wants to continue voicing the character until he "drops dead", or until he can no longer perform the voice accurately.

Characteristics

Mario is depicted as a portly plumber who lives in the fictional land of the Mushroom Kingdom with Luigi, his younger, taller brother. The television series and film depict Mario and Luigi as originating from Brooklyn, New York. Mario's infancy, in which he was transported by a stork to the Mushroom Kingdom, was first depicted in Super Mario World 2: Yoshi's Island. In a 2005 interview, Miyamoto stated that Mario's physical age was about 24–25 years old, and Nintendo Power stated that his birthday is October 11.

He wears a long-sleeved red shirt, a pair of blue overalls with yellow buttons, brown shoes, white gloves, and a red cap with a red "M" printed on a white circle. In Donkey Kong, he wore a pair of red overalls, and a blue shirt. In Super Mario Bros., he wore a brown shirt with red overalls. He has blue eyes, and, like Luigi, has brown hair, and a dark brown or black mustache. This consistent difference in color is attributed to being a relic from designing the characters for their original platforms, wherein certain features were actively distinguished while others had to be curtailed due to technical limitations.

Occupation and hobbies
Mario's occupation is plumbing, though in the original Donkey Kong games he is a carpenter. Mario has also assumed several other occupations: in the Dr. Mario series of puzzle games, which debuted in 1990, Mario is portrayed as a medical physician named "Dr. Mario"; in the Game Boy game Mario's Picross, Mario is an archaeologist; in Mario vs. Donkey Kong 2: March of the Minis, Mario is the president of a profitable toy-making company. Mario is an athlete in Mario sports games in games such as tennis and golf, as well as a kart racer in the Mario Kart series. In September 2017, Nintendo confirmed on their official Japanese profile for the character that Mario was no longer considered a plumber, but the statement was changed in March 2018.

Relationships
Mario usually saves Princess Peach and the Mushroom Kingdom and purges antagonists, such as Bowser, from various areas; since his first game, Mario has usually had the role of saving the damsel in distress. Originally, he had to rescue his girlfriend Pauline in Donkey Kong from Donkey Kong. Pauline was soon replaced by Princess Peach in Super Mario Bros., although Pauline has reappeared in the Mario vs. Donkey Kong series and is considered "Mario's friend" instead. Mario reprises his role of saving Peach in the Super Mario series, but Mario himself was rescued by Peach in role-reversal in Super Princess Peach. Mario rescued Princess Daisy of Sarasaland in Super Mario Land, but Luigi has since been more linked to her; in Super Smash Bros. Melee, the text explaining Daisy states that "after her appearance in Mario Golf, gossips portrayed her as Luigi's answer to Mario's Peach."

Luigi is Mario's brother. He is a companion in the Mario games, and the character whom the second player controls in two-player sessions of many of the video games. Luigi has also occasionally rescued Mario as seen in Mario Is Missing! and the Luigi's Mansion series. Super Mario Land 2: 6 Golden Coins for the Game Boy saw the arrival of Wario, Mario's greedy counterpart and self-declared arch rival, who usually assumes the role of a main antagonist or an antihero. The dinosaur character Yoshi serves as Mario's steed in games such as Super Mario World.

Abilities
Jumping—both to access places and as an offensive move—is a common gameplay element in Mario games, especially the Super Mario series. By the time Super Mario RPG was released, jumping became such a signature act of Mario that the player was often tasked with jumping to prove to non-player characters that he was Mario. Mario's most commonly portrayed form of attack is jumping to stomp on the heads of enemies, first used in Super Mario Bros. This jump-stomp move may entirely crush smaller enemies on the stage, and usually deals damage to larger ones, sometimes causing secondary effects.

This attack often enables Mario to knock the turtle-like Koopa Troopas into or out of their shells, which can be used as weapons. Subsequent games have elaborated on Mario's jumping-related abilities. Super Mario World added the ability to spin-jump, which allows Mario to break blocks beneath him. The Game Boy version of Donkey Kong allows Mario to jump higher with consecutive jumps, and perform a back-flip. In Super Mario 64, Mario gains new jumping abilities such as a sideways somersault; a ground pound, which is a high-impact downward thrusting motion; and the "Wall Kick", which propels him upwards by kicking off walls.

Power-ups

Mario uses items, which give him various powers, and differ between the games he is in. The first power-up Mario used was the Hammer in Donkey Kong.

Super Mario Bros. introduced the basic three power-ups that have become staples for the series, especially the 2D games — the Super Mushroom, which causes Mario to grow larger and be able to survive getting hit once; the Fire Flower, which allows Mario to throw fireballs; and the Starman (later named Super Star), which gives Mario temporary invincibility. These powers have appeared regularly throughout the series. Throughout the series' history, there have been several kinds of Mushroom power-ups, including the 1-up Mushroom, which gives Mario an extra life; the Poison Mushroom, which causes Mario to take damage; the Mega Mushroom, which causes Mario to grow very large and become invincible for a short period of time; and the Mini Mushroom, which causes Mario to shrink, and in some games, climb up walls.

A reoccurring power-up throughout the series is an item that gives Mario the ability of flight. The first of this type was introduced in Super Mario Bros. 3: the first of which, the Super Leaf, gives Mario a raccoon (a transliteration of tanuki) tail and ears, and lets Mario swing his tail as an attack, float gently to the ground, and temporarily fly. There is an alternate version of this power-up in the same game, the Raccoon Suit (or tanuki suit) and grants Mario the same abilities as the Super Leaf, but with the addition of being able to temporarily turn into a statue, granting him invincibility. There is also a P-Wing that he can use which makes him look like he has a Super Leaf, but gives him unlimited flight until he gets hit or finishes the level. In Super Mario World, an item called the Cape Feather was introduced that gave Mario a cape, and in addition to being able to fly, let Mario spin and swing his cape as an attack. In Super Mario Land 2: 6 Golden Coins, a carrot was available that gave Mario rabbit ears that allowed him to glide, and in Super Mario 64, Mario could acquire an item called the Wing Cap, which only let him fly temporarily, before disappearing. Super Mario Sunshine introduces a pump-water spraying device named "F.L.U.D.D.", which abilities included spraying water and hovering.

Super Mario Galaxy introduced new power-ups, including the Bee Mushroom, which turned Mario into a bee and allowed him to fly temporarily; the Boo Mushroom, which turned Mario into a Boo, allowing him to float and pass through some walls; the Spring Mushroom, which encased Mario in a spring, allowing him to jump higher; and the Ice Flower, which allowed the player to temporarily walk or skate on water and lava without sinking or taking damage. Super Mario Galaxy 2 introduced more power-ups, including the Cloud Flower which allows Mario to create platforms in midair, and Rock Mario, which transforms Mario into a boulder that could be used to break through barriers.

New Super Mario Bros. Wii updated the Ice Flower, which allows Mario to shoot ice balls that temporally freeze enemies; and introduced the Propeller Mushroom, which allows him to fly; as well as the Penguin Suit, which allows Mario to easily traverse ice and swim through the water in addition to shooting ice balls. Super Mario 3D Land introduced the Boomerang Flower, which allows Mario to throw boomerangs at nearby enemies; and the Statue Leaf, which allows Mario to turn into a statue. In New Super Mario Bros. U, the Super Acorn makes its debut. This transforms Mario into his new flying squirrel form where he can glide and stick on walls. Super Mario 3D World introduced the Super Bell, which transforms Mario into his cat form, as well as a Double Cherry to make multiple copies of himself.

Appearances and evolution

Super Mario series

Mario is the protagonist and title character of the Super Mario series. Each game varies in its plot, but most of them have the ultimate goal of Mario rescuing Princess Peach after being kidnapped by Bowser. Mario explores a variety of locations, titled "worlds", and along the way, he can collect items and defeat enemies. Most levels have an end goal, such as stars or flagpoles, that he needs to reach in order to move on to the next. The series is divided by fans into two general sets of games: the 2D side-scrolling Super Mario games and the 3D Super Mario games.

2D games
The Super Mario series had Mario starring in platform games, beginning with Super Mario Bros. on the Nintendo Entertainment System (NES) in 1985. In these games, Mario traverses worlds that contain a set number of levels for Mario to complete. In them, he traverses them from moving left to right, the screen scrolling in the direction he moves. Mario has the goal of reaching the end of the level to move onto the next, typically marked with a flagpole. These games are less focused on plot and more on platforming; most commonly, Bowser kidnaps Peach, and Mario, with the help of Luigi and other characters, sets out to rescue her. Most worlds have mini boss battles which typically involve fighting Bowser Jr. or one of several Koopalings. The final level is a fight against Bowser.

His first appearance in the 2D variant of the series was Super Mario Bros. in 1985, which began with a 16x32 pixel rectangle prototype as the character; Takashi Tezuka suggested the character to be Mario after the success of one of his role prior, Mario Bros. Certain other gameplay concepts were cut as well, such as how Mario could fly in a rocket ship and fire bullets. Originally designed with a small Mario in mind with the intention of increasing his size further in development, the developers implemented the feature of his size changes via power-ups as they considered it a fun addition. The concept was influenced by Japanese folktales.

Super Mario Bros. 2 was originally not going to be a sequel to Super Mario Bros., and was originally going to be a game called Doki Doki Panic; the game directed by Kensuke Tanabe. After unsuccessful gameplay, development was shelved until he was requested to implement mascots from the Yume Kōjō festival. The game was redesigned with the help of Miyamoto and released exclusively in Japan in 1987. Minoru Arakawa, however, requested the game to be changed to a Mario game for its international release. Much of the original gameplay concepts were retained, with mainly graphical changes being made. One of the changes included the retexturing of the four main playable characters of Doki Doki Panic, and since they varied in height it was the first instance where Mario was noticeably shorter than Luigi.

Super Mario Bros. 3 experimented with Mario's looks with different power-ups that represented different creatures. An example included the raccoon tail, which was chosen over a power-up that represented a centaur. The levels were created after power-ups were chosen, and were designed to take advantage of his varying abilities. The raccoon tail power-up became a staple in the Mario franchise, being used as an ability in a variety of Mario games that even stretched outside of the Super Mario series such as Mario Kart 7. The game's success led to an animated television series, The Adventures of Super Mario Bros. 3, with Mario being portrayed by Walker Boone.

Hiroshi Yamauchi wanted a launch title for the Game Boy that prominently featured Mario, as he believed in the statement "fun games sold consoles". Super Mario Land was designed without the help of Miyamoto, a first for the series. The game uses completely different elements to pair with the small screen due to the Game Boy's portability. For example, instead of rescuing Princess Peach from Bowser in the Mushroom Kingdom, Mario is instead rescuing Princess Daisy from Tatanga in Sarassaland. Mario was designed with line art.

Super Mario World was the first video game to feature Yoshi as a companion to Mario. Miyamoto had always wanted a dinosaur-like companion ever since the original Super Mario Bros., but the concept was never achievable due to limited hardware. Since Super Mario World took place in a land of dinosaurs, Takashi Tezuka requested Shigefumi Hino to draw a character based on Miyamoto's concepts and sketches which he drew during development of Super Mario Bros. 3. Yoshi's rideability was inspired by Miyamoto's love for horseback riding. Super Mario World released during a console war between Nintendo and Sega; Sega's mascot, Sonic the Hedgehog, was considered a "cooler" alternative to Mario, to which Miyamoto apologized for.

The plot for Super Mario Land 2: 6 Golden Coins has Mario pursue something for his own benefit rather than for someone else, his goal trying to reclaim ownership of his island, Mario Land, from Wario. The game was developed by Nintendo Research & Development 1 (R&D1); the company was unmotivated by the Super Mario series, and when they were tasked with creating a Super Mario game without Miyamoto they created Wario to emphasize the frustration of working with a character they did not make. The name "Wario" is word play of "Mario" and "Warui", the latter meaning "bad" in Japanese to mean "bad Mario".

The character's models and backgrounds in New Super Mario Bros. were 3D, but still only allowed for left and right movement and is considered 2.5D. With the 2D series of Super Mario games being absent for 14 years, the previous installment being released in 1992, game mechanics improved drastically. Since the characters were no longer sprites and the backdrops were not tile-based, the developers were nearly restrictionless; new game mechanics, such as Mario teetering off of trees and swinging on ropes, were implemented. New Super Mario Bros. was the first 2D Super Mario game to use voice acting, with Charles Martinet voicing Mario and Luigi. It was followed by three games similar to New Super Mario Bros., namely New Super Mario Bros. Wii, New Super Mario Bros. 2, and New Super Mario Bros. U, the latter of which being the first game to feature Mario in high-definition graphics (HD).

3D games

Most Super Mario games in 3D feature open world gameplay; instead of being confined to only allow moving left and right, Mario can move in any direction and the player can complete the level how they please. The player chooses from one of the multiple objectives before entering a level, and Mario is tasked with completing that goal which ultimately ends with an obtainable item such as a star. These games feature a more complex narrative, but most still have Mario rescuing a kidnapped Princess Peach from Bowser. Early into most of the games, Mario befriends an ally which helps Mario on his journey and gives him a unique ability to obtain his goal.

Mario's debut 3D role was Super Mario 64; since the concept of 3D video games was still new at the time, the developers knew they were helping to pave the way for future games, and they were not restricted on what the standard game was like. However, when Yoshiaki Koizumi had to create a 3D model and animation of Mario, he had no frame of reference and struggled with the task. Koizumi stated how the whole concept was "arguably tough", but was overtaken by the enjoyment of innovating in a new field. Mario's movement was among the top priority in the game's development, with his animation being tested long before the basic layout of the game's locations were in place. Super Mario 64 was one of the first games voiced by Charles Martinet, and Mario's character model was made with the N-World toolkit.

Super Mario Sunshine was the first Nintendo game after Satoru Iwata became the CEO of Nintendo, succeeding Hiroshi Yamauchi. The game's original concept did not feature Mario, as the developers believed the role was too out of the ordinary for such a character. Later on, when they used a generic man for the role instead, they believed having a realistic person alongside a character like Mario would cause "incongruity", and it was ultimately changed to Mario instead. Mario's ally, F.L.U.D.D., was one of ten design options but was chosen because it fit the game's theme, although it was not their favorite option in looks.

Super Mario Galaxy had Mario exploring a number of spherical planets, which the developers at the time knew simply jumping on enemies would be difficult to perform. They instead took advantage of the Wii Remote and Nunchuk having motion controls, and gave Mario a "spin" attack where he knocks over the enemies via spinning. To also balance the game's difficulty, Mario was given less hitpoints. With the amount of creative freedom the space-themed setting gave, many power-ups and transformations were implemented based on the worker's suggestions.

In order to create a sense of familiarity for Super Mario Odyssey, various references to the Super Mario series were put in the game's environment. For example, Pauline was chosen to be a major aspect of the "Metro Kingdom" due to the kingdom representing the core of the game. Mario was also given a variety of costumes to represent other smaller games, such as the Mario's Picross series. The development team found the most fun way to use the Joy-Con controllers' motion controls was throwing a hat, and the gameplay was centered around Mario throwing his cap.

64, Sunshine, and Galaxy were re-released on the Nintendo Switch in 2020 as part of the 35th anniversary of Super Mario Bros. in a collection pack titled Super Mario 3D All-Stars. While the games were kept generally the same as their original counterparts, there were some minor changes. All three of the games were given HD graphics, and there were also a couple of changes to Mario in Super Mario 64; a glitch where Mario could move at super high speeds with a glitch was removed; one of Mario's voice clips in which he says "so long King Bowser", which unintentionally sounded like "so long, gay Bowser", was also replaced.

Other Super Mario games
There have also been a variety of Super Mario games starring Mario that do not have standard typical 2D or 3D platforming. The Super Mario 3D series does have 3D gameplay, but the stages are linear and do not allow for open-world movement. The Super Mario Maker games are a series of game creation systems where the player can create their own 2D Super Mario levels and play ones created by others. Super Mario Run is a 2D platforming mobile game with other unnatural gameplay aspects.

The main aspect of Super Mario 3D Land was bridging the aspects of 2D and 3D Super Mario games. One of the issues brought up was how Mario looked too small in comparison to the large terrain and the small, portable screen of the Nintendo 3DS, so the game's camera system needed to be fixed to one position in certain occasions. The game brought with it the "Tanooki tail" power-up, which was originally introduced in Super Mario Bros. 3, and its existence was teased by the developers to the fans prior to its official announcement. Concepts for Mario, which included a skater outfit and a power-up that would make Mario grow to a large size, were cut.

Super Mario 3D World on the Wii U included the "Cat Mario" power-up, which was implemented to help newcomers play the game and add new gameplay features such as climbing up walls. Another power-up was the "Double Cherry", which was added accidentally; one of the developers added a second Mario into the game in error, and found it humorous when both Mario's were somehow controllable at the same time. In 2020, also as part of the Super Mario Bros. 35th anniversary, Nintendo re-released Super Mario 3D World on the Nintendo Switch with the additional mode titled Bowser's Fury.

The developers of Super Mario Run were mainly inspired by speedrunners during development, as they took note of how when they would try to beat a 2D Super Mario game as fast as possible they would never let go of the run button. With this, they made the core gameplay concept revolve around how Mario does not stop moving forward.

Other Mario games

While the most prominent use of Mario has been directed toward the Super Mario series, various spinoff series that split into numerous games covering various genres have also been released. This includes genres such as role-playing games (RPGs), puzzle games, sports games, and even educational games in the 1990s.

RPG games

Mario has been the protagonist of various role-playing video games (RPGs), beginning with Super Mario RPG on the Super Nintendo Entertainment System (SNES). The developer of Super Mario RPG, Yoshio Hongo for Square, liked the character Mario and believed he would fit well in an RPG format. He discussed the idea with Miyamoto, and according to him the meeting went well. The game was a critical and commercial success, and led to two other spinoff RPG series starring the character, Paper Mario and Mario & Luigi. Of the two series, the Paper Mario is the only one still currently running with Paper Mario: The Origami King in 2020, as the company behind the Mario & Luigi series, AlphaDream, went bankrupt in 2019.

Super Mario RPG was originally going to have a sequel, titled Super Mario RPG 2, and was going to release for the Nintendo 64. The original developer, Square, had signed a deal with Sony to release Final Fantasy VII for the PlayStation, so Nintendo had Intelligent Systems develop the game instead. The new art designer, Naohiko Aoyama, proceeded to change every character to two-dimensional in order to bring out "cuter" graphics compared to low-polygon three-dimensional graphics on the console. In the Paper Mario games, Mario is often aided by numerous allies who progress the story while Mario remains silent.

Unlike Paper Mario, both Mario and Luigi have voices in the Mario & Luigi series and are voiced by Charles Martinet. According to the developers, the early titles in the series began with character sprites; the developers were generally inexperienced and did not know much about hardware at the time. once the Nintendo 3DS was released, the developers had the chance to switch to 3-dimensional graphics. They decided to change the background and world design but chose to keep the characters as 2D renderings of 3D characters as they believed it made it easier to convey comedic expressions. In 2013, they believed Mario took too much of the spotlight in the Mario franchise, and they made Luigi the more story-focused character in Mario & Luigi: Dream Team.

Sports games

Nintendo has explored a variety of sports games featuring Super Mario property, which include tennis, golf, baseball, soccer, kart racing, and other miscellaneous. Of which, the only four that were defined to be official series and are still currently running are Mario Tennis, Mario Golf, Mario & Sonic at the Olympic Games, and Mario Kart. The Mario Kart series is the most successful, selling over 150 million games in its entirety.

In the 1984 video game Golf, although one of the two playable characters looks similar to that of him, wearing red clothes and black pants, he is never directly referred to be Mario; In 1997, his look was changed in the re-release of the Famicon Disk System to that more like the character, and Nintendo later confirmed the character was Mario in a guide book of the game in 1991, marking his first sports video game appearance. He then directly appeared in NES Open Tournament Golf in 1991 as one of two playable characters, the other being Luigi with a variety of other Mario characters with supporting roles. The character sprites were designed by Eiji Aonuma, his first project in graphical art design.

After the unsuccessful attempt on the Virtual Boy with Mario's Tennis, the first tennis game featuring Mario, Nintendo gave licensing rights to Camelot Software Planning to develop a second Mario-themed tennis game for the Nintendo 64. Each character had a unique ability, with Mario having an all-around average set of skills to pair with his type of character. This ideology was later continued into Mario Power Tennis.

The Mario Kart franchise began with Super Mario Kart for the Super Nintendo Entertainment System in 1992; early in development, the game did not have any Mario-themed elements. A few months into the process, the designers were testing how one character would look at another they had just passed. They implemented Mario, simply to see how he would look inside a kart, and the original concept was scrapped entirely after they decided he looked better than the previous non-defined characters. Similar to the Mario & Luigi series, he appears as a sprite that turns in 16 different angles.

Puzzle games

Mario has also starred in a variety of multiple puzzle games, but sometimes only makes an appearance and is not playable. The first of which to release was Wrecking Crew, designed by Yoshio Sakamoto. After which, three main series and a variety of spin-offs were released starring him, including Dr. Mario, Mario vs. Donkey Kong, and Mario Picross, the latter of which inactive.

The original game in the Dr. Mario series, also titled Dr. Mario, was designed by Takahiro Harada and had Mario assuming the role of a doctor instead of a plumber. His appearance and role has generally remained the same; to celebrate his 30th anniversary in the series an 8-bit rendering of his original appearance was made unlockable in the most recent game, Dr. Mario World. Mario vs. Donkey Kong is centered around "Mini Marios", wind-up toys that resemble Mario. The Mario's Picross series was an attempt by Nintendo to capitalize on the popularity of Mario and the success of puzzle games in Japan at the time. Released in 1995, the game was popular and followed by two sequels, Super Mario Picross and Picross 2, but the first game was only made available to American audiences in 2020.

Due to the abandonment of the SNES-CD hardware in the 1990s, a project developed by Nintendo and Phillips, as part of Nintendo's dissolving agreement with Philips they gave the licensing rights to Mario and The Legend of Zelda property to release games on the CD-i. Multiple games were developed by the inexperienced Fantasy Factory, which included the puzzle game Hotel Mario in 1994. Via Animation Magic, Hotel Mario had various cutscenes of Mario and Luigi which borrowed animation elements from Disney and J. R. R. Tolkien. Mario was voiced by Marc Graue as the game was released prior to Charles Martinet receiving the role for voicing the character.

Educational games

Due to the popularity of the Super Mario series, various educational games starring the character were released and appealed to younger audiences. These games had little involvement from Nintendo, with the games releasing for the NES, Super Nintendo Entertainment System (SNES), and personal computers. The last of which in the genre to release was Mario Teaches Typing 2 in 1997 before the production of such games was discontinued.

Mario is Missing! is one of the only occasions where Mario himself was kidnapped and is rescued by another character. In the game, Mario and Luigi approach Bowser to stop his plans, but Mario is then captured; Luigi traverses real-world locations to follow after him, solving trivia along the way. A similar game was released without the help of Miyamoto, Mario's Time Machine, which starred Mario against Bowser instead.

Mario's Game Gallery has the player competing against various card and board games against Mario. The game was Charles Martinet's first official voice acting role for Mario, one year prior to Super Mario 64.

For Mario Teaches Typing, the head of Interplay Productions Brian Fargo saw the success of the typing game Mavis Beacon Teaches Typing, and knew a character like Mario as the teacher would be appealing. Pre-dating Mario's Game Gallery, Martinet did not voice Mario. After release, the concept was so successful, it began a negative relationship between Fargo Les Crane, the creator of Mavis Beacon Teaches Typing. Mario Teaches Typing 2 was released in 1997, which Martinet voiced Mario for. When they were approved of creating Mario's Game Gallery, another Mario-themed education game also released that was of poor quality, so Miyamoto met with Fargo and halted production of any further education games using the character.

Cameos

Apart from his platformer and spin-off game appearances, Mario has made guest appearances in non-Mario games, such as Mike Tyson's Punch-Out!! and Tennis where Mario is a referee, in Pac-Man Vs., he is the in-game announcer. Mario appears as a playable character in NBA Street V3 and SSX on Tour. He also appears as a playable character in Super Smash Bros. series. He makes countless cameo appearances in many forms in many games, such as portraits and statues in The Legend of Zelda: A Link to the Past, The Legend of Zelda: Ocarina of Time, and Metal Gear Solid: The Twin Snakes. On an ending screen that appears in the NES version of the video game Tetris, Mario appears with Luigi dancing to the music, which is a version from prelude to the opera Carmen. In that screen also appears Peach, Bowser and other Nintendo characters such as Link, Samus, Donkey Kong or Pit.

In other media
The first appearance of Mario in media other than games was Saturday Supercade, an animated television series produced by Ruby-Spears Productions in 1983. The 1986 original video animation Super Mario Bros.: The Great Mission to Rescue Princess Peach! features Mario (voiced by Toru Furuya) as the protagonist. The animated series The Super Mario Bros. Super Show! features a live-action series of skits that stars former WWF manager "Captain" Lou Albano as Mario and Danny Wells as Luigi. Mario appeared in a book series, the Nintendo Adventure Books. The other two animated series, The Adventures of Super Mario Bros. 3 and Super Mario World, star Walker Boone as Mario and Tony Rosato as Luigi.

Mario is portrayed by Bob Hoskins in the 1993 film loosely based on the Super Mario series, titled Super Mario Bros.. In the film, he is the cynical older brother who takes great pride in being a plumber and is a parental figure to Luigi, portrayed by John Leguizamo. At first he holds no belief in unusual things happening, but meeting Daisy and a trip to Dinohattan soon changes his mind. Hoskins was ultimately cast to play the character after other choices falling out such as Dustin Hoffman and Danny DeVito. Hoskins had previously done multiple roles in children's films and kept suggesting changes to the script before he agreed to portray the character. According to one of the films' directors, Annabel Jankel, Hoskins was mainly considered due to his physical appearances. In a 2007 interview, Hoskins considered the role his worst choice in his acting career and admitted to constantly drinking before and during filming.

Mario will be voiced by Chris Pratt in the upcoming 2023 film adaptation.

Reception

As Nintendo's mascot, Mario is widely considered to be the most famous video game character in history, and has been called an icon of the gaming industry. The Mario series of video games has sold more than 510 million copies, making it the best-selling video game franchise. Mario was one of the first video game character inductees at the Walk of Game in 2005, alongside Link and Sonic the Hedgehog. Mario was the first video game character to be honored with a wax figure in the Hollywood Wax Museum in 2003. In 1990, a national survey found that Mario was more recognizable to American children than Mickey Mouse. Mario has also been called the "most recognisable" figure in the gaming industry.

Creator Shigeru Miyamoto has stated that Mario is his favorite out of all characters that he has created. Electronic Gaming Monthly gave Mario their "Coolest Mascot" award for 1996, calling him "an age-old friend." Nintendo Power listed Mario as their favorite hero, citing his defining characteristics as his mustache, red cap, plumbing prowess, and his mushrooms. In a poll conducted in 2008 by Oricon, Mario was voted the most popular video game character in Japan.

GameDaily listed the "unlikely hero" on its top 25 video game archetypes, and used Mario as an example of this. It stated that in spite of the fact that he should have run out of energy through the first level, he kept going. Mario ranked fourth on GameDaily's top ten Smash Bros. characters list. Mario was fourth on UGO's list of the "Top 100 Heroes of All Time". They also listed Mario's hat twenty-first on their list of "The Coolest Helmets and Headgear in Video Games", stating "there's always somebody at your Halloween party wearing one." Empire ranked him as the second-greatest video game character. CNET listed him first on its list of the "Top 5 video game characters". He was voted 100th in IGN's Top 100 Villains for his appearance in Donkey Kong Junior, adding "This Mario is a total jerk, holding Donkey Kong Jr.'s dad hostage", and he has also been elected by GamesRadar as the 90th "most dastardly ne'er-do-wells" villain in video games in their "top 100".

Legacy

Mario has been established as a pop culture icon, and has appeared on lunch boxes, T-shirts, magazines, commercials (notably, in a Got Milk? commercial), in candy form, on shampoo bottles, cereal, badges, board games, and as a plush toy.

Mario has inspired unlicensed paintings, performances on talent shows such as India's Got Talent, and short films, which have been viewed hundreds of thousands of times. The character has been present in a number of works created by third parties other than Nintendo, such as in the iOS and Android video game Platform Panic, in which one of the purchasable skins is a reference to him.

Many people and places have been named or nicknamed after Mario. Bergsala, the distributor of Nintendo's products in the Nordic and the Baltic countries, is located at Marios Gata 21 (Mario's Street 21) in Kungsbacka, Sweden, named after Mario. Many sports stars, including Bundesliga football players Mario Götze and Mario Gómez, National Hockey League player Mario Lemieux, Italian footballer Mario Balotelli, and Italian cyclist Mario Cipollini have been given the nickname "Super Mario". In a suburb of the Spanish city of Zaragoza, streets were named after video games, including "Avenida de Super Mario Bros".

Mario's legacy is recognized by Guinness World Records, who awarded the Nintendo mascot, and the series of platform games he has appeared in, seven world records in the Guinness World Records: Gamer's Edition 2008. These records include "Best Selling Video Game Series of All Time", "First Movie Based on an Existing Video Game", and "Most Prolific Video Game Character", with Mario appearing in 116 original games. In 2009, Guinness World Records listed him as the second most recognizable video game character in the United States, recognized by 93% of the population, second only to Pac-Man who was recognized by 94% of the population. In 2011, readers of Guinness World Records Gamer's Edition voted Mario as the top video game character of all time.

Mario appeared in the 2016 Summer Olympics closing ceremony to promote the 2020 Summer Olympics in Tokyo. In a pre-recorded video, the prime minister Shinzō Abe became Mario to use a Warp Pipe planted by Doraemon from Shibuya Crossing to Maracanã Stadium. Abe then appeared dressed as Mario in an oversized Warp Pipe in the middle of the stadium.

Mario Day (previously known as National Mario Day) is celebrated on March 10, as when that date is presented as Mar 10 it resembles "Mario". Since 2016, the day was officially observed by Nintendo, and celebrates this day annually by promoting Mario games and holding Mario-related events.

Notes

References

External links

 
 
 Mario on Super Mario Wiki
 Official website for the Mario series
 Mario entry on Nintendo.com

Action video game characters
Animated human characters
Corporate mascots
Fantasy film characters
Fictional American people in video games
Fictional characters from New York City
Fictional hammer fighters
Fictional Italian American people
Fictional Italian people in video games
Fictional physicians
Fictional plumbers
Male characters in advertising
Male characters in video games
Mario (franchise) characters
Mario (franchise)
Nintendo protagonists
Super Smash Bros. fighters
Video game characters introduced in 1981
Video game characters with fire or heat abilities
Video game characters
Video game mascots
Twin characters in video games